Jamsil Baseball Stadium is a baseball stadium located at 25 Olympic-ro, Songpa-gu, Seoul, South Korea. The stadium holds 25,000 people and was built from April 1980 to July 1982. It makes up the Seoul Sports Complex along with the nearby Seoul Olympic Stadium, and hosted the baseball events during the 1988 Summer Olympics. 

It is the home of the LG Twins and Doosan Bears of the KBO League. It has one basement level. The stadium has 59 entrances consisting of 49 inner gates and 10 outer gates. The parking lot allows 2,200 cars to park. The stadium can be reached by Seoul Subway Line 2, Line 9, or by bus. 

Jamsil Baseball Stadium was renovated in 2007 for about 1.5 billion won. Grass on the field was replaced, drains were installed, and sprinklers were upgraded to prevent heavy rain damage. In 2009, a viewing party was held at the stadium for the final game of the 2009 World Baseball Classic between South Korea and Japan. After the 2012 baseball season, Seoul Metropolitan Facilities Management Corporation changed the soil of the ground for easier maintenance and prevention of injuries. They changed all seats except for the third floor, built a new locker room for the away team, and remodeled restrooms for fans. Before the 2020 season, the outfield seats were also renovated. The chairs have been replaced with folding chairs, allowing spectators sitting in the outfield seats to watch the game more comfortably.

See also

Dongdaemun Baseball Stadium
Mokdong Baseball Stadium
Gocheok Sky Dome

References

External links
1988 Summer Olympics official report. Volume 1. Part 1. p. 166.

Venues of the 1988 Summer Olympics
Baseball venues in South Korea
Sports venues completed in 1982
Buildings and structures in Songpa District
Sports venues in Seoul
LG Twins
Doosan Bears
1982 establishments in South Korea
20th-century architecture in South Korea